Lina Queyroi (born 18 May, 2001) is a French rugby union player who plays for Blagnac SCR and the France women's national rugby union team.

Early life
Queyroi attended the Saint-Yrieix-la-Perche rugby school.

Career
Having made her debut in 2019 for Blagnac SCR she filled many positions as a utility player for the first couple of seasons before beginning to play regularly in the centre. On September 3, 2022 she made her international debut for France, against Italy. She was subsequently named in France's team for the delayed 2021 Rugby World Cup in New Zealand. Queyroi kicked a second half conversion as France became the first team to reach the semi-finals with a 39-3 win over Italy.

References

2001 births
Living people
French female rugby union players